Hargus Melvin Robbins (January 18, 1938 – January 30, 2022), known by his nickname "Pig," was an American session keyboard player, having played on records for many artists, including Patsy Cline, Dolly Parton, Connie Smith, Patti Page, Loretta Lynn, Kenny Rogers, George Jones, Charlie Rich, Bob Dylan, Neil Young, J.J. Cale, John Hartford, John Stewart, Mark Knopfler, Alan Jackson, Merle Haggard, Roger Miller, David Allan Coe, Moe Bandy, George Hamilton IV, Sturgill Simpson, Conway Twitty, Ween,and Al Hirt. He was blind, having lost his sight at age four due to an accident involving his father's knife.

Life and career
Robbins was born on January 18, 1938, in Spring City, Tennessee.  He learned to play piano at age seven, while attending the Nashville School for the Blind. He played his first session in 1957, with his first major recording being George Jones's "White Lightning".  Thereafter he played keyboards for scores of country music artists.

Between 1963 and 1979, Robbins also recorded eight studio albums: one on Time Records, three on Chart Records, and four on Elektra Records, as well as an independent live album. He was awarded Musician of the Year by the Country Music Association in 1976 and 2000.

His 1959 single "Save It", recorded under the name Mel Robbins, was covered by The Cramps on their 1983 album Off the Bone.

Robbins joined producers Alan Autry and Randall Franks on In the Heat of the Night’s 1991 Christmas Time's A Comin’ CD, appearing on several cuts and receiving feature credit on David Hart's recording of "Let it Snow".

On October 21, 2012, Robbins was inducted into the Country Music Hall of Fame.

In Robert Altman's classic, Nashville, a hippie piano player nicknamed "Frog" is fired by Henry Gibson's character (an egotistical country singer), who yells at the studio engineer: "When I ask for Pig, I want Pig!"

Robbins died on January 30, 2022, at the age of 84.

Discography

Albums

Singles

Collaborations 
 Blonde on Blonde - Bob Dylan (1966)
 Just Because I'm a Woman - Dolly Parton (1968)
 Any Day Now - Joan Baez (1968)
 David's Album - Joan Baez (1969)
 Summer Side of Life - Gordon Lightfoot (1971)
 Coat of Many Colors - Dolly Parton (1971)
 My Tennessee Mountain Home - Dolly Parton (1973)
 Hank Wilson's Back Vol. I - Leon Russell (1973)
 Okie - J. J. Cale (1974)
 Jolene - Dolly Parton (1974)
 Lovin' and Learnin' - Tanya Tucker (1976)
 Look My Way - Rosemary Clooney (1976)
 Love Lifted Me - Kenny Rogers (1976)
 Kenny Rogers - Kenny Rogers (1977)
 Daytime Friends - Kenny Rogers (1977)
 Love or Something Like It - Kenny Rogers (1978)
 The Gambler - Kenny Rogers (1978)
 Kenny - Kenny Rogers (1979)
 American Son - Levon Helm (1980)
 Dreamlovers - Tanya Tucker (1980)
 Some Days Are Diamonds - John Denver (1981)
 Both Sides of Love - Paul Anka (1981)
 Old Ways - Neil Young (1985)
 Shadowland - k.d. lang (1988)
 Pocket Full of Gold - Vince Gill (1991)
 Back Home Again - Kenny Rogers (1991)
 In My Wildest Dreams - Kenny Chesney (1994)
 The Tattooed Heart - Aaron Neville (1995)
 The Woman in Me - Shania Twain (1995)
 Treasures - Dolly Parton (1996)
 Golden Heart - Mark Knopfler (1996)
 12 Golden Country Greats - Ween (1996)
 The Key - Vince Gill (1998)
 Backwoods Barbie - Dolly Parton (2008)
 Better Day - Dolly Parton (2011)
 The Weight of These Wings - Miranda Lambert (2016)
 The Cry of the Heart - Connie Smith (2021)

See also
The Nashville A-Team

References

External links
Hargus "Pig" Robbins Interview NAMM Oral History Program 
  as Hargus Robbins
  as Pig Robbins
  as Mel Robbins
 

1938 births
2022 deaths
20th-century American keyboardists
20th-century American male musicians
20th-century American pianists
21st-century American keyboardists
21st-century American male musicians
21st-century American pianists
21st-century organists
People from Spring City, Tennessee
Musicians from Nashville, Tennessee
American country keyboardists
American organists
American male organists
American country pianists
American male pianists
Blind musicians
Elektra Records artists
American session musicians
Country Music Hall of Fame inductees
Members of the Country Music Association
Country musicians from Tennessee